Ceratosporella bicornis is a species of fungi.

References

External links 

 
 Ceratosporella bicornis at Mycobank
 Ceratosporella bicornis at gbif

Fungi described in 1923
Ascomycota enigmatic taxa